Since the 1990s, Nickelodeon, a worldwide children's television network and franchise, owned by Paramount Global, has had an involvement in the creation and theming of amusement parks rides.

Several amusement parks have featured themed areas entirely devoted to the Nickelodeon brand whilst others have featured standalone attractions. Nickelodeon attractions currently exist at Movie Park Germany, Pleasure Beach Blackpool, Mall of America, Sea World, and American Dream Meadowlands. Attractions previously existed at California's Great America, Canada's Wonderland, Carowinds, Dreamworld, Kings Dominion, Kings Island, Universal Studios Florida, Universal Studios Hollywood and WhiteWater World.

History
On June 7, 1990, Universal Studios Florida opened with an attraction named Nickelodeon Studios. It was a television taping studio for the cable television channel Nickelodeon.

In 1995, Nickelodeon Splat City opened at three former Paramount Parks: California's Great America, Kings Dominion and Kings Island. These attractions were inspired by the game shows that aired on the television network and generally involved slime. In 1999, Kings Dominion closed Nickelodeon Splat City in preparation for the opening of its 2000 attraction, Nickelodeon Central. Nickelodeon Central brought a retheme of many of the park's children's rides as well as the addition of new ones. Kings Island followed suit, closing its Splat City in 2000 and opening Nickelodeon Central in 2001. This area would later be expanded and renamed Nickelodeon Universe in 2006.

In 2002, Australian theme park Dreamworld opened Nickelodeon Central. In 2003, Nickelodeon Central opened at California's Great America, Canada's Wonderland and Carowinds, and Jimmy Neutron's Nicktoon Blast opened in Universal Studios Florida. Expansions of these areas took place in 2005, 2006 and 2008 for Carowinds, Kings Island and Dreamworld, respectively. The Kings Island area was also renamed to Nickelodeon Universe at the same time. In 2007, Movie Park Germany opened a similar area entitled Nickland. In 2007, it was announced that Nickelodeon Universe would be opening in Mall of America in 2008, replacing Camp Snoopy. In 2009 and 2010, Cedar Fair terminated their contract with Nickelodeon resulting in all of the areas being rethemed to Planet Snoopy. In early 2011, at a cost of  million, Pleasure Beach Blackpool opened Nickelodeon Land. By mid-2011, Dreamworld had closed their Nickelodeon Central and rethemed it to the generic Kid's World theme (it was later revealed that the park had struck a deal with DreamWorks Animation). In 2012, Universal's Superstar Parade had its first performance which features floats based on SpongeBob SquarePants and Dora the Explorer and later opened a SpongeBob gift shop in Woody Woodpecker's Kidzone. In September 2016, it was announced that a new Nickelodeon Universe would open in the upcoming American Dream Meadowlands mall and entertainment complex owned by the Triple Five Group, which also owns the Mall of America. Nickelodeon Universe American Dream opened to visitors on 25 October 2019.

Locations

Attractions

Below is a list of all of the attractions at Nickelodeon themed areas around the world. The dates shown in the columns refer to the opening and closing dates for the ride under that name. It does not mean that the ride was closed and/or removed.

Shows and Events

Some Nickelodeon shows and events held in different theme parks around the world recently.

Character appearances
A variety of Nickelodeon costumed characters have been showcased at theme parks, parades, and other themed-entertainment experiences. Since the mid-2000's, a majority of the listed costumes have been designed and fabricated by Custom Characters Inc., a company that Nickelodeon Experience Design often collaborates with.

Aaahh!!! Real Monsters: Krumm, Ickis
The Adventures of Jimmy Neutron, Boy Genius: Jimmy Neutron
The Angry Beavers: Norbert, Daggett
Avatar: The Last Airbender: Aang
Back at the Barnyard: Otis
The Backyardigans: Uniqua, Pablo, Tyrone
Blue's Clues: Blue
Bubble Guppies: Molly, Gil, Bubble Puppy
Butterbean's Cafe: Butterbean
Danny Phantom: Danny Phantom
Dora the Explorer: Dora, Diego, Jaguar, Boots
The Fairly OddParents: Cosmo, Wanda
Fanboy & Chum Chum: Fanboy, Chum Chum
Hey Arnold!: Arnold Shortman
Little Bill: Little Bill
The Loud House: Lincoln Loud
Nella the Princess Knight: Nella
Ni Hao Kai-Lan: Kai-Lan
PAW Patrol: Chase, Marshall, Rubble, Skye, Rocky, Zuma

The Ren & Stimpy Show: Ren, Stimpy
Rise of the Teenage Mutant Ninja Turtles: Leonardo, Donatello, Raphael, Michelangelo
Rocko's Modern Life: Rocko
Rugrats: Tommy Pickles, Chuckie Finster, Angelica Pickles, Phil DeVille, Lil DeVille, Susie Carmichael, Lou Pickles
Santiago of the Seas: Santiago
Shimmer and Shine: Shimmer, Shine
SpongeBob SquarePants: SpongeBob SquarePants, Patrick Star, Squidward Tentacles, Sandy Cheeks, Mr. Krabs, Pearl Krabs, Mrs. Puff
Team Umizoomi: Milli, Geo
Teenage Mutant Ninja Turtles: Leonardo, Donatello, Raphael, Michelangelo, Foot Soldier, April O'Neil
T.U.F.F. Puppy: Dudley Puppy
The Wild Thornberrys: Eliza Thornberry, Donnie Thornberry
Winx Club: Bloom, Stella, Aisha
Wonder Pets!: Linny, Tuck, Ming Ming

Gallery

See also
 :Category:Nickelodeon in amusement parks
 Nickelodeon Splat City

References

 
Amusement rides by theme
Amusement parks